Aneurops is a genus of beetles in the family Monotomidae, containing the following species:

 Aneurops championi Sharp, 1900
 Aneurops convergens (Sharp, 1900)

References

Monotomidae